The Irving Square Historic District is a historic district on Irving Square, Waverly, South, Columbia, Irving, Gordon and Hollis Streets in Framingham, Massachusetts.  It encompasses a portion of the town's central business district just south of the railroad tracks.  It includes buildings on Hollis Street, extending south from Irving Street to Gordon Street, and buildings on Irving from Hollis to just beyond Columbia Street.  Most of these commercial buildings were built between 1890 and 1930, most in the 20th century.  The district was listed on the National Register of Historic Places in 1982.

See also
Concord Square Historic District, just north of the railroad tracks
National Register of Historic Places listings in Framingham, Massachusetts

References

Historic districts in Framingham, Massachusetts
National Register of Historic Places in Middlesex County, Massachusetts
Historic districts on the National Register of Historic Places in Massachusetts